Mirella Coutinho (born 5 October 1994) is a water polo player from Brazil.

She played with the Brazil women's national water polo team at the  2011 World Aquatics Championships.

She played for the University of Hawaii.

References

External links
  https://falauniversidades.com.br/entrevista-com-mirella-coutinho/

1994 births
Living people
Brazilian female water polo players
Pan American Games medalists in water polo
Pan American Games bronze medalists for Brazil
Water polo players at the 2015 Pan American Games
Water polo players at the 2019 Pan American Games
Medalists at the 2015 Pan American Games
Medalists at the 2019 Pan American Games
21st-century Brazilian women